This is a timeline of the Commonwealth of Nations from the Balfour Declaration of 1926. Some regard the Balfour Declaration as the foundation of the modern Commonwealth. 


1920s (from 1926)

1930s

1940s

1950s

1960s

1970s

1980s

1990s

2000s

2010s

2020s

Footnotes

Regional timelines